In fluid mechanics, the Rayleigh–Plesset equation or Besant–Rayleigh–Plesset equation is an ordinary differential equation which governs the dynamics of a spherical bubble in an infinite body of incompressible fluid.  Its general form is usually written aswhere
 is the density of the surrounding liquid, assumed to be constant
 is the radius of the bubble
 is the kinematic viscosity of the surrounding liquid, assumed to be constant
 is the surface tension of the bubble-liquid interface

The Rayleigh–Plesset equation is derived from the Navier–Stokes equations under the assumption of spherical symmetry.

History 

Neglecting surface tension and viscosity, the equation was first derived by W. H. Besant in his 1859 book with the problem statement stated as An infinite mass of homogenous incompressible fluid acted upon by no forces is at rest, and a spherical portion of the fluid is suddenly annihilated; it is required to find the instantaneous alteration of pressure at any point of the mass, and the time in which the cavity will be filled up, the pressure at an infinite distance being supposed to remain constant (in fact, Besant attributes the problem to Cambridge Senate-House problems of 1847). Neglecting the pressure variations inside the bubble, Besant predicted the time required to fill the cavity to be

where the integration was carried out by Lord Rayleigh in 1917, who derived the equation from energy balance. The equation was first applied to traveling cavitation bubbles by Milton S. Plesset in 1949 by including effects of surface tension.

Derivation 

The Rayleigh–Plesset equation can be derived entirely from first principles using the bubble radius as the dynamic parameter. Consider a spherical bubble with time-dependent radius , where  is time. Assume that the bubble contains a homogeneously distributed vapor/gas with a uniform temperature  and pressure . Outside the bubble is an infinite domain of liquid with constant density  and dynamic viscosity . The temperature  is assumed to be constant. At a radial distance  from the center of the bubble, the varying liquid properties are pressure , temperature , and radially outward velocity .

Mass conservation 

By conservation of mass, the inverse-square law requires that the radially outward velocity  must be inversely proportional to the square of the distance from the origin (the center of the bubble).  Therefore, letting  be some function of time,

In the case of zero mass transport across the bubble surface, the velocity at the interface must be

which gives that

In the case where mass transport occurs, the rate of mass increase inside the bubble is given by

with  being the volume of the bubble.

with  being the surface area of the bubble.  Now by conservation of mass , therefore .  Hence

Therefore

In many cases, the liquid density is much greater than the vapor density, so that  can be approximated by the original zero mass transfer form , so that

Momentum conservation 

Assuming that the liquid is a Newtonian fluid, the incompressible Navier–Stokes equation in spherical coordinates for motion in the radial direction gives

Substituting kinematic viscosity  and rearranging gives

whereby substituting  from mass conservation yields

Note that the viscous terms cancel during substitution.  Separating variables and integrating from the bubble boundary  to  gives

Boundary conditions 

Let  be the normal stress in the liquid that points radially outward from the center of the bubble.  In spherical coordinates, for a fluid with constant density and constant viscosity,

Therefore at some small portion of the bubble surface, the net force per unit area acting on the lamina is

where  is the surface tension.  If there is no mass transfer across the boundary, then this force per unit area must be zero, therefore

and so the result from momentum conservation becomes

whereby rearranging and letting  gives the Rayleigh–Plesset equation

Using dot notation to represent derivatives with respect to time, the Rayleigh–Plesset equation can be more succinctly written as

Solutions 

More recently,  analytical closed-form solutions were found  for the Rayleigh–Plesset equation for both an empty and gas-filled bubble   and were generalized to the N-dimensional case. The case when the surface tension is present due to the effects of capillarity were also studied.

Also, for the special case where surface tension and viscosity are neglected, high-order analytical approximations are also known.

In the static case, the Rayleigh–Plesset equation simplifies, yielding the Young-Laplace equation:

When only infinitesimal periodic variations in the bubble radius and pressure are considered, the RP equation also yields the expression of the natural frequency of the bubble oscillation.

References 

Fluid dynamics
Equations of fluid dynamics
Ordinary differential equations